Longman is a British publishing firm.

Longman may also refer to:

 Longman (surname)
 Adam Outram or Longman of the North
 Division of Longman, Australian electoral division
 Longman, Inverness, Scotland, UK
 Leeroy Thornhill or Longman. musician
 Longman Mills or Longman Mills Rubber Spares Manufacturer ESTD 1940